Alfred H. Annan (October 1, 1874 – January 28, 1931) was an American golfer. He competed in the men's individual event at the 1904 Summer Olympics. He later worked as a salesman. He died in 1931 while unemployed. His body was found on the steps of Eads Hall at Washington University in St. Louis with a bullet wound in his temple and a revolver nearby.

References

External links
 

1874 births
1931 suicides
American male golfers
Amateur golfers
Olympic golfers of the United States
Golfers at the 1904 Summer Olympics
Golfers from Missouri
People from Webster Groves, Missouri
Suicides by firearm in Missouri